The 2012 British Formula Ford Championship was the 37th edition of the British Formula Ford Championship. It commenced on 7 April at Oulton Park and ended on 30 September at Donington Park after 8 rounds and 24 races, held in the United Kingdom and Germany.

Drivers and teams

Race calendar and results
An eight-round calendar was announced on 4 December 2011. Six rounds will support British F3 and British GT events, with a round at Brands Hatch Indy supporting the Deutsche Tourenwagen Masters, and a round at the Nürburgring, also counting towards the Formula Ford EuroCup.

Championship standings
In the Championship Class, points were awarded on a 30-27-24-22-20-18-16-14-12-10-8-6-4-3-2 basis to the top fifteen classified drivers, with one point awarded to all other finishers. An additional point was given to the driver who set the fastest lap in each race.

Drivers' Championship

Notes

Teams

Constructors

Nations Cup

References

External links
 The home of the British Formula Ford Championship

British Formula Ford Championship seasons
Formula Ford
British Formula Ford